Hans Pausch (born 9 September 1957) is a retired German football defender.

References

1957 births
Living people
German footballers
1. FC Nürnberg players
MTV Ingolstadt players
Bundesliga players
2. Bundesliga players
Association football defenders
People from Weiden in der Oberpfalz
Sportspeople from the Upper Palatinate
Footballers from Bavaria